Anthony Irvin Sills (born December 5, 1955) is an American professional golfer who played on the PGA Tour and later became a golf teaching professional.

Sills, who is Jewish, was born and raised in Los Angeles, California. As a youth, he caddied at the Riviera Country Club, including when the club hosted the Los Angeles Open. Sills attended Palisades High School and later the University of Southern California, where he was a member of the golf team with future PGA Tour golfer Scott Simpson.

Sills turned professional in 1980. He had 22 top-10 finishes in PGA Tour events including a win at the 1990 Independent Insurance Agent Open. In that tournament, he beat Gil Morgan with a par on the first extra hole in a sudden-death playoff. His best finish in a major championship was T15 at the 1985 U.S. Open. His best year was 1990 when he finished 61st on the money list.

After his touring days were over, Sills taught putting and the short game with Putting Arc co-founder V.J. Trolio at Old Waverly Golf Club in West Point, Mississippi.

Sills has a daughter, Emily, who played golf for the University of Tennessee.

In 2011 Sills was inducted into the Los Angeles High Schools Sports Hall of Fame.

Professional wins (1)

PGA Tour wins (1)

*Note: The 1990 Independent Insurance Agent Open was shortened to 54 holes due to rain.

PGA Tour playoff record (1–0)

Results in major championships

Note: Sills never played in The Open Championship

CUT = missed the half-way cut
"T" = tied

See also
1982 PGA Tour Qualifying School graduates
1988 PGA Tour Qualifying School graduates
1989 PGA Tour Qualifying School graduates
1994 PGA Tour Qualifying School graduates

References

External links

American male golfers
USC Trojans men's golfers
PGA Tour golfers
Jewish golfers
Golfers from Los Angeles
Jewish American sportspeople
1955 births
Living people
21st-century American Jews